The Cal State Northridge Matadors (branded as the CSUN Matadors) are the athletic teams that represent California State University, Northridge in Northridge, Los Angeles, California. The Matadors field 17 teams in nineteen sports. The Matadors compete in NCAA Division I and are members of the Big West Conference. CSUN has been a member of the Big West Conference since the summer of 2001 for most sports. The men's and women's indoor track and field teams compete in the Mountain Pacific Sports Federation instead. Men's volleyball also competed in the Mountain Pacific Sports Federation, but began to compete in the Big West beginning in 2018.

Nickname
The Matador nickname was suggested in 1958 by student submissions, and was chosen over four other finalists. These included the Apollos, Falcons, Rancheros and Titans. The Matador is said to reflect the region's Spanish heritage.

History 
CSUN had previously been a member of the Big Sky Conference from 1996 to 2000. The Matadors won 34 NCAA Division II National Titles before moving up to Division I in 1990. That still ranks third all time in Division II.

Sports sponsored

Baseball

The CSUN Matadors baseball team is a varsity intercollegiate athletic team of California State University, Northridge in Northridge, California, United States. The team is a member of the Big West Conference, which is part of the NCAA Division I. Cal State Northridge's first baseball team was fielded in 1959. The team plays its home games at 1,200-seat Matador Field. During its time in Division II, the Matadors baseball team won two national championships (1970, 1984).

Basketball

Men's basketball

The CSUN Matadors men's basketball team represents California State University, Northridge in Northridge, California, United States. The school's team currently competes in the Big West Conference, which is part of the NCAA Division I. Cal State Northridge's first men's basketball team was fielded in 1958–1959. The team plays its home games at the 2,400-seat Premier America Credit Union Arena.

Women's basketball

The CSUN Matadors women's basketball team represents California State University, Northridge in Northridge, California, United States. The school's team currently competes in the Big West Conference, which is part of the NCAA Division I. Cal State Northridge's first women's basketball team was fielded in 1958–1959. The team plays its home games at the 2,400-seat Premier America Credit Union Arena.

Soccer

Men's soccer
The CSUN Matadors men's soccer team have an NCAA Division I Tournament record of 1–7 through seven appearances.

Women's soccer
The CSUN Matadors women's soccer team have an NCAA Division I Tournament record of 0–1 through one appearance.

Softball
The Matadors softball team has appeared in two Women's College World Series in 1993 and 1994, advancing to the title game in 1994 before falling to Arizona. During its time in Division II, Matadors softball won four national championships.

Women's volleyball
The CSUN Matadors women's volleyball team have an NCAA Division I Tournament record of 1–5 through five appearances.

Former varsity sports 
 Cal State Northridge Matadors football (discontinued 2001)
 Swimming (men's and women's) (discontinued 2010)

Non-varsity sports

Rugby 
CSUN women's rugby began as a university recognized club team in 2011, after a 17-year hiatus. CSUN women's rugby played in the Collegiate SoCal Division 2 in 2012, and finished ranked first in Southern California and 14th in the Nation in Division 2. In 2013, the team finished first in California and sixth in the Nation in Division 2.

Championships

Appearances 

The CSUN Matadors competed in the NCAA Tournament across 13 active sports (6 men's and 7 women's) 58 times at the Division I level.

 Baseball (6): 1965, 1991, 1992, 1993, 1996, 2002
 Men's basketball (2): 2001, 2009
 Women's basketball (4): 1999, 2014, 2015, 2018
 Men's soccer (7): 2002, 2003, 2004, 2005, 2012, 2013, 2016
 Women's soccer (1): 2012
 Softball (14): 1992, 1993, 1994, 1995, 1996, 1997, 1998, 1999, 2000, 2001, 2003, 2004, 2007, 2015
 Women's tennis (1): 2001
 Men's indoor track and field (2): 1998, 2008
 Men's outdoor track and field (3): 1992, 2007, 2010
 Women's indoor track and field (3): 1996, 1996, 2000
 Women's outdoor track and field (8): 1991, 1994, 1995, 1997, 2000, 2001, 2004, 2008
 Men's volleyball (2): 1993, 2010
 Women's volleyball (5): 1992, 1996, 2003, 2004, 2013

Team 

CSUN has never won a national championship at the NCAA Division I level.

CSUN won 30 national championships at the Division II level.

 Baseball (2): 1970, 1984
 Men's golf (3): 1969, 1973, 1974
 Men's gymnastics (2): 1968, 1969
 Women's gymnastics (1): 1982
 Men's outdoor track and field (1): 1975
 Softball (4): 1983, 1984, 1985, 1987
 Men's swimming and diving (9): 1975, 1977, 1978, 1979, 1981, 1982, 1983, 1984, 1985
 Women's swimming and diving (4): 1982, 1987, 1988, 1989
 Men's tennis (1): 1969
 Women's tennis (1): 1982
 Women's volleyball (2): 1983, 1987

Below are four national championships that were not bestowed by the NCAA:

 Women's outdoor track and field – Division I (3): 1978, 1979, 1980 (AIAW)
 Women's volleyball – Division II (1): 1980 (AIAW)

Individual 

CSUN had 6 Matadors win NCAA individual championships at the Division I level.

At the NCAA Division II level, CSUN garnered 163 individual championships.

References

External links
 

 
1958 establishments in California
Sports clubs established in 1958